Omnidens amplus, meaning "large all-tooth", is an extinct species of large Cambrian animal known only from a series of large mouth apparatus, originally mistaken as the mouthparts of anomalocaridids. When first named, it was interpreted as a giant priapulid, but is now considered a panarthropod. Its mouth apparatus closely resembles that of the smaller gilled lobopodian Pambdelurion, indicating it is likely to have been a close relative of that species, with which it may be synonymous. Omnidens fossils are found in the Maotianshan Shales.

Description

Omnidens is only known from mouthparts. The preserved mouthparts would have formed a short muscular, potentially protrusible pharynx surrounded by circles of spiny sclerites, which were reminiscent of the scalids of priapulids, kinorhynchs, and loriciferans. The inside of the pharynx was also lined with several rows of pharyngeal sclerites. Its overall appearance was likely similar to that of its close relative Pambdelurion. Spines preserved near the mouthparts of Omnidens may belong to frontal appendages like those of other stem-group arthropods.

Classification

Omnidens is classified as a stem-group arthropod. It is so similar to Pambdelurion that the two taxa may be synonymous, but no Pambdelurion specimens are known from the same strata as Omnidens. It is possible that Omnidens mouthparts belong to the contemporary lobopodians Megadictyon or Jianshanopodia.

Distribution

Omnidens is a member of the Chengjiang Biota of China, which dates to approximately 520 Ma, during Cambrian Stage 3. Omnidens-like mouthparts have also been found in the slightly younger Xiaoshiba Lagerstätte. Pambdelurion, which has mouthparts nearly identical to those of Omnidens, is from the Sirius Passet Lagerstätte of Greenland.

History

The first-described specimen of Omnidens was first described in 1994. Omnidens fossils were later described as specimens of Peytoia and Parapeytoia until finally being recognized as a distinct species in 2006 and named Omnidens amplus. Omnidens was later identified as a close relative of the gilled lobopodian Pambdelurion.

References 

Cambrian animals
Prehistoric protostome genera
Fossil taxa described in 2006
Maotianshan shales fossils
Cambrian genus extinctions